This is a list of high schools in Libertador General Bernardo O'Higgins Region, Chile, including those public (municipal), subsidized private, and private, organized by province and by city. This list includes former high schools.
 Cachapoal
 Cardenal Caro
 Colchagua
 References
 External links

Cachapoal Province

Codegua 
 Instituto Lautaro
 Liceo Municipal de Codegua

Coínco 
 Liceo Municipal Luis Gregorio Valenzuela Lavín

Coltauco 
 Escuela Agrícola San Vicente de Paul
 Escuela Berta Zamorano Lizana
 Instituto Monseñor Lecaros

Doñihue 
 Colegio Los Cipreses (in Lo Miranda)
 Liceo Claudio Arrau León

Graneros 
 Colegio Cristo Obrero
 Colegio Graneros
 Colegio Nuestra Señora
 Instituto Santa Teresa de Los Andes
 Liceo Profesor Misael Lobos Monroy

Las Cabras 
 Colegio Mistral
 Liceo Francisco Antonio Encina Armanet

Machalí 
 Colegio Arturo Prat
 Colegio La Cruz
 Colegio Real de Carén
 Colegio San Ignacio
 Escuela Básica Particular Diego Portales
 Liceo Machalí
 Trinity College
 Villa María College

Malloa 
 Liceo Municipal Zoila Rosa Carreño

Mostazal 
 Colegio Particular San Andrés
 Colegio Teresiano Juanita Fernández
 Liceo Elvira Sánchez de Garcés
 Liceo Alberto Hurtado

Olivar 
 Liceo Técnico Municipal Olivar
 Olivar College

Peumo 
 Colegio Alcalde Pedro Urbina
 Liceo Jean Buchaman de Larraín

Pichidegua 
 Liceo Latinoamericano

Quinta de Tilcoco 
 Escuela Particular Sagrado Corazón de Jesús
 Liceo Municipal República de Italia

Rancagua 

 Colegio Alonso de Ercilla
 Colegio Bernardo O'Higgins
 Colegio Cuisenaire
 Colegio Don Bosco
 Colegio Ena Bellemans Montti
 Colegio Hispano-Chileno del Pilar
 Colegio Inglés Saint John
 Colegio Interamericano
 Colegio La Merced
 Colegio Las Américas
 Colegio La República
 Colegio Magister
 Colegio Monte Castello
 Colegio Particular Andrés Bello
 Colegio Particular Gabriela Mistral
 Colegio Quimahue
 Colegio Rancagua
 Colegio Sagrado Corazón
 Colegio San Sebastian School
 Colegio Santa María Goretti
 Colegio Tomás Guaglén
 Colegio Weber School (closed in 2012)
 Escuela Particular Niño Jesús de Praga
 Instituto Inglés Rancagua
 Instituto O'Higgins de Rancagua
 Instituto Regional de Educación
 Instituto Sagrado Corazón
 Instituto San Lorenzo
 Instituto San Andrés
 Instituto Sewell
 Liceo Bicentenario Óscar Castro Zúñiga
 Liceo Comercial Jorge Alessandri
 Liceo Comercial Diego Portales
 Liceo Ernesto Pinto Lagarrigue
 Liceo Industrial Presidente Pedro Aguirre Cerda
 Liceo José Victorino Lastarria
 Liceo Manuel de Salas
 Liceo María Luisa Bombal
 Liceo Técnico Profesional Santa Rosa
 Liceo Técnico Santa Cruz de Triana

Rengo 
 Centro Educacional Asunción
 Colegio Antilén
 Colegio San Antonio del Baluarte
 Liceo Bicentenario Oriente
 Liceo Luis Urbina Flores
 Liceo Politécnico Tomás Marín de Póveda
 Liceo Saint Gregory's

Requínoa 
 Liceo Requínoa
 Liceo San José

San Vicente de Tagua Tagua 
 Colegio Almenar
 Colegio El Salvador
 Colegio España
 Colegio Nehuén
 Colegio Santa Inés
 Instituto San Vicente de Tagua Tagua
 Liceo Agrícola El Tambo
 Liceo Bicentenario Ignacio Carrera Pinto

Cardenal Caro Province

Litueche 
 Liceo El Rosario

Marchigüe 
 Instituto Cardenal Caro

Navidad 
 Liceo Municipal Pablo Neruda

Paredones 
 Liceo de Paredones
 Liceo Mercedes Urzúa Díaz

Pichilemu 

 Colegio Charly's School
 Colegio de la Preciosa Sangre de Pichilemu
 Liceo Agustín Ross Edwards

Colchagua Province

Chépica 
 Liceo Fermín del Real Castillo

Chimbarongo 
 Colegio Chimbarongo
 Colegio San José de la Montaña
 Complejo Educacional de Chimbarongo
 Escuela Agrícola Don Gregorio
 Escuela Agrícola Las Garzas

Lolol 
 Liceo de Lolol

Nancagua 
 Liceo Juan Pablo II
 Liceo Particular Cardenal Raúl Silva Henríquez

Palmilla 
 Escuela Municipal San José del Carmen

Peralillo 
 Liceo Víctor Jara

Placilla 
 Escuela San Francisco de Placilla

San Fernando 

 British College
 Colegio Arrayanes
 Colegio El Real
 Colegio Inmaculada Concepción
 Colegio Particular Subvencionado San Esteban
 Colegio Valle de Colchagua
 Complejo Educacional Las Araucarias
 Instituto Comercial Alberto Valenzuela Llanos
 Instituto Hans Christian Andersen
 Instituto San Fernando
 Liceo Agrícola El Carmen de San Fernando
 Liceo Coeducacional José Gregorio Argomedo
 Liceo de Niñas Eduardo Charme
 Liceo Industrial de San Fernando
 Liceo Neandro Schilling
 Liceo Técnico Felisa Clara Tolup Zeiman
 San Fernando College

Santa Cruz 

 Colegio Evelyn's School
 Colegio Manquemávida
 Colegio Santa Cruz de Unco
 Instituto Regional Federico Errázuriz
 Liceo María Auxiliadora
 Instituto Politécnico Santa Cruz
 Liceo Santa Cruz

References 

Schools in O'Higgins Region